Ptiliidae is a family of very tiny beetles (including the smallest of all beetles) with a cosmopolitan distribution. They are colloquially called featherwing beetles, because the hindwings are narrow and feathery. 

There are approximately 600 described species in 80 genera, but large numbers of specimens in collections await description and the true number of species is likely to be much higher than this. 

The family is divided into 3 subfamilies:
 Acrotrichinae
 Cephaloplectinae
 Ptiliinae

Description 
The weight is approximately 0.4 milligrams. Ptillid wings are feathery due to the much higher effective viscosity of air at small body sizes, which makes normal insect wings much less efficient. Unlike other small insects with feathery wings, such as parasitic wasps like fairyflies, ptillids do not fly using a clap and fling motion, but instead fly using a figure of eight pattern where the wings clap at the apex of the upward and downward strokes. They are capable of flying at speeds comparable to their larger relatives. 

The small size has forced many species to sacrifice some of their anatomy, like the heart, crop, and gizzard. While the exoskeleton and respiration system of the insects seems to be the major limiting factors regarding how large they can get, the limit for how small they can become appears to be related to the space required for their nervous and reproductive systems.   

Many species (e.g. in Ptinella, Pteryx, and Ptinellodes) are polymorphic, with two morphs so distinct that they appear to be different species or genera. There is a normal morph with well-developed eyes, wings and pigmentation, and also a vestigial morph in which these features are reduced or lacking. The vestigial morph is more common, making up 90% or more of individuals.

Life cycle and reproduction 
Ptiliidae have a short life cycle, with an egg-adult time of 32-45 days observed for three British species of Ptinella. They can reproduce continuously under favourable conditions, with larvae often co-occurring with both teneral and fully hardened adults at different times of the year. The eggs are very large in comparison to the adult female (nearly half her body length) so only one egg at a time can be developed and laid. Thelytokous parthenogenesis is exhibited by several species, these only being known from females.

Ecology  

Adults and larvae are microphagous, feeding on the spores and hyphae of fungi, as well as other organic detritus. They are found in a wide variety of habitats, including rotting and fungus infested wood, tree holes, under kelp along shorelines and within or near ant and termite nests.

Evolution 
Fossil ptiliids have been recorded from the Oligocene, roughly 30 million years ago from the Eocene, 46.2–43.5 million years ago, and from the Cretaceous Lebanese and Burmese amber, dated to 125 and 99 million years ago, respectively.

References

External links 

Family description on Tolweb

 
Beetle families
Staphylinoidea